Phokion G. Kolaitis ACM (born July 4, 1950) is a computer scientist who is currently a Distinguished Research Professor at UC Santa Cruz and a Principal Research Staff Member at the IBM Almaden Research Center. His research interests include principles of database systems, logic in computer science, and computational complexity.

Education
Kolaitis obtained a Bachelor's Degree in Mathematics from the University of Athens in 1973 and a Master's Degree and Ph.D in Mathematics from the University of California, Los Angeles in 1974 and 1978, respectively.

Career and research
Kolaitis is currently a Distinguished Research Professor at the Computer Science and Engineering Department of University of California, Santa Cruz. He is also a Principal Research Staff Member in the theory group at the IBM Almaden Research Center. He is known for his work on principles of database systems, logic in computer science, computational complexity, and other related fields.

Selected publications 
Data exchange: semantics and query answering, R Fagin, PG Kolaitis, RJ Miller, L Popa, Theoretical Computer Science 336 (1), 89-124

Conjunctive-query containment and constraint satisfaction, PG Kolaitis, MY Vardi, Journal of Computer and System Sciences 61 (2), 302-332

Data exchange: getting to the core, R Fagin, PG Kolaitis, L Popa, ACM Transactions on Database Systems (TODS) 30 (1), 174-210

Composing schema mappings: Second-order dependencies to the rescue, R Fagin, PG Kolaitis, L Popa, WC Tan, ACM Transactions on Database Systems (TODS) 30 (4), 994-1055

On the decision problem for two-variable first-order logic, E Grädel, PG Kolaitis, MY Vardi, Bulletin of symbolic logic, 53-69

Recognition
 1993 Guggenheim Fellowship, John Simon Guggenheim Memorial Foundation 
 2005 Fellow, Association for Computing Machinery
 2007 Foreign Member, Finnish Academy of Science and Letters
 2008 Association for Computing Machinery PODS Alberto O. Mendelzon Test-of-Time Award for the paper “Conjunctive-Query Contain-ment and Constraint Satisfaction” (co-authored with Moshe Y. Vardi)
 2010 Fellow, American Association for the Advancement of Science 
 2013 International Conference on Database Theory Test-of-Time Award for the paper  “Data Exchange: Semantics and Query Answering” (co-authored with R. Fagin, R.J. Miller, and L. Popa)
 2014 Honorary Doctoral Degree, Department of Mathematics and Department of Informatics & Telecommunications, University of Athens, Greece 
 2014 Association for Computing Machinery PODS Alberto O. Mendelzon Test-of-Time Award for the paper “Composing Schema Mappings: Second-Order Logic to the Rescue” (co-authored with R. Fagin, L. Popa, and W.-C. Tan)
 2017 Foreign Member, Academia Europaea
 2020 Alonzo Church Award for Outstanding Contributions to Logic and Computation (Co-Winner)

References

External links
 UC Santa Cruz homepage

Living people
Greek scientists
Greek mathematicians
1950 births
People from Athens